Crassula spathulata (Spathula-leaf Crassula) is a creeping, succulent ground-cover, indigenous to the Eastern Cape Province and southern KwaZulu-Natal, South Africa, where it is found in leaf-litter on rocky ridges, often around the edges of forests. 

It is common as a ground-cover in cultivation, and several different cultivars are in circulation.

Description

The small, ovate-rounded, spathula-shaped leaves have definite leaf-stalks (unlike the sessile leaves of Crassula pellucida). 
The base of each leaf is truncate or rounded (heart-shaped), and the leaves have rounded bumps along their edges. 

The thin, prostrate stems of this species are sometimes square in cross-section. 

Tiny pink-white, star-shaped flowers appear on branched flower stems in Autumn.

References

spathulata
Flora of the Cape Provinces